Hao Ting was a Chinese diplomat. He was born in Dengzhou, Henan. He was Ambassador of the People's Republic of China to Afghanistan (1958–1965).

References

Ambassadors of China to Afghanistan
People from Dengzhou
Year of birth missing
Possibly living people